The Pace That Thrills may refer to:

 The Pace That Thrills (1925 film), American silent film
 The Pace That Thrills (1952 film), American film